Kempner may refer to:

People
Alan H. Kempner (1897–1985), American stockbroker and rare books collector, son-in-law of Carl Loeb who founded Loeb, Rhoades & Co.
Alicia Kempner, American bridge player
Aubrey J. Kempner (1880–1973), British mathematician
Aviva Kempner (born 1946), American filmmaker
Friederike Kempner (1836–1904), Polish-German Jewish poet and writer
Harris L. Kempner (1903–1987), American businessman
Isaac Herbert Kempner (1873–1967), founder of the Imperial Sugar Corporation and mayor of Galveston, Texas
Lydia Rabinowitsch-Kempner (1871–1935), American physician
Michael Kempner, the founder, chairman, president and CEO of independent public relations and marketing firm MWW Group in New Jersey, USA
Nan Kempner (1930–2005), New York City socialite, famous for dominating society events, shopping, charity work and fashion
Patty Kempner (born 1942), retired medley and breaststroke swimmer from the United States, and 1960 Olympic gold medallist
Robert Kempner (1899–1993), German-born American lawyer
Scott Kempner (born 1954), the rhythm guitarist with The Dictators since they formed in 1974
S. Marshall Kempner (1898–1987), American investment banker and founder of the French Bank of California, brother-in-law of Peggy Guggenheim
Suzanna Kempner (born 1985), English actress, singer and stand-up comedian who studied at the Royal Academy of Music
Vitka Kempner (1920–2012), Lithuanian-Jewish partisan leader in World War II

Other uses
Kempner, Texas, city in Lampasas County, Texas, United States
Kempner High School, public high school in Sugar Land, Texas, USA and a part of the Fort Bend Independent School District
Kempner series, modification of the harmonic series, formed by omitting all terms whose denominator expressed in base 10 contains a 9 digit

es:Kempner
nl:Kempner
pt:Kempner